Qarash Qa Tappehsi-ye Sofla (also Romanized as Qārāsh Qā Tappephsī-ye Soflá; also known as Qārāsh Qātepsī) is a village in Aslan Duz Rural District, Aslan Duz District, Parsabad County, Ardabil Province, Iran. At the 2006 census, its population was 155, in 27 families.

References 

Towns and villages in Parsabad County